Přišimasy is a municipality and village in Kolín District in the Central Bohemian Region of the Czech Republic. It has about 900 inhabitants.

Administrative parts
Villages of Horka and Skřivany are administrative parts of Přišimasy.

References

Villages in Kolín District